Fucophilus is a fucoidan-utilizing genus of bacteria from the phylum Verrucomicrobiota with one known species (Fucophilus fucoidanolyticus). Fucophilus fucoidanolyticus has been isolated from the gut contend of a sea cucumber (Stichopus japonicus).

References

 

Verrucomicrobiota
Monotypic bacteria genera
Bacteria genera
Taxa described in 2003